Terminalia intermedia may refer to one of several species of tropical trees:

Terminalia intermedia , synonym of Terminalia diptera , a threatened species shown on the list of endangered plants
Terminalia intermedia , synonym of Terminalia catappa 
Terminalia intermedia , synonym of Terminalia microcarpa